Phasmaphleps is a genus of flies in the family Dolichopodidae from the western Pacific. It contains only one species, Phasmaphleps pacifica, which occurs in the Samoan Islands, Tonga, Fiji, Solomon Islands, Tuvalu and Palau.

The generic name is derived from the Greek words phasma ("ghost" or "phantom") and phleps ("tube" or "vein"), referring to the absence of vein M just beyond the dm-cu crossvein in the fly's wings. The specific epithet refers to the species' wide distribution on islands in the Pacific Ocean.

References

Diaphorinae
Diptera of Australasia
Monotypic Diptera genera
Fauna of Tonga
Insects of Fiji
Insects of the Solomon Islands
Fauna of Tuvalu
Fauna of Palau
Invertebrates of American Samoa
Fauna of Samoa